Cabancalan can refer to the following places in the Philippines:

 Cabancalan, Mandaue, a barangay in the city of Mandaue
 Cabancalan, a barangay in the municipality of Sevilla, Bohol

See also 
 Kabankalan, city of the Philippines in the province of Negros Occidental